Eriocaulon santapaui is a critically endangered monocotyledonous plant endemic to the Western Ghats around Khandala and Pune in the state of Maharashtra, India.

References

santapaui
Flora of Maharashtra
Endemic flora of India (region)